Wind-Up Wilma is a 1981 animated television special and the third of The Flintstone Specials limited-run prime time revival of The Flintstones produced by Hanna-Barbera Productions. The special premiered on NBC on October 4, 1981. In the special, Wilma Flintstone is recruited to play on Bedrock's baseball team.

Like many animated series created by Hanna-Barbera in the 1970s, the show contained a laugh track created by the studio, one of the last productions to do so.

Summary
Wilma is a celebrity when she gets a shot at the big leagues and becomes a pitcher for the Bedrock Dodgers after nailing a couple of robbers with a melon at the grocery store; however, she and Fred argue over her ambition to pitch for the team because Fred thinks a woman's place is in the home.

Voice cast
 Henry Corden as Fred Flintstone
 Mel Blanc as Barney Rubble, Dino
 Jean Vander Pyl as Wilma Flintstone, Pebbles Flintstone
 Gay Autterson as Betty Rubble, Traffic Cop
 John Stephenson as Frank Frankenstone
 Julie McWhirter as Hidea Frankenstone
 Jim MacGeorge as Stubby Frankenstone, Cop
 Don Messick as Announcer
 Joe Baker as Mean, Checker
 Paul Winchell as Umpire, Thief, Reporter #1
 Frank Welker as Finrock

Home media
On October 9, 2012, Warner Archive released Wind-Up Wilma on DVD in region 1 as part of their Hanna-Barbera Classics Collection, in a release entitled The Flintstones Prime-Time Specials Collection: Volume 2. This is a Manufacture-on-Demand (MOD) release, available exclusively through Warner's online store and Amazon.com.

References

External links

 

1981 television specials
1980s animated television specials
NBC television specials
1980s American television specials
The Flintstones television specials
Hanna-Barbera television specials